The Adelaide Motorsport Festival is an annual motorsport event first held in 2014 using a shortened [1.6 km (0.87 mi)] version of the former Australian Grand Prix (held in Adelaide from 1985 to 1995) and the Adelaide 500 race track within Victoria Park / Pakapakanthi, in the south-eastern parklands of the South Australian capital of Adelaide.

History 
The Adelaide Motorsport Festival was created and is run by event director Tim Possingham, a motorsport fan and competitor, celebrating all forms of motoring and motorsport.

The inaugural event was held on April 12 to 13 in 2014 before switching to late November/early December, at a similar time to when the Australian Grand Prix was held in Adelaide.

Using the section of the track within Victoria Park / Pakapakanthi, which includes the Pit Straight and Senna Chicane, a section of Wakefield Road was used to create a 1.6km circuit. The surrounding parklands contains the pit paddock area, vehicle displays, catering and VIP areas operated by car brands including Ferrari, Audi, BMW, Aston Martin and Porsche.

The first event in 2014 attracted a small crowd of 1800 people, growing to in excess of 45,000 in 2018.

The event did not run from 2019 to 2021 due to state government funding cuts. In the run up to the 2022 South Australian state election, opposition leader Peter Malinauskas announced that the Adelaide Motorsport Festival and the Adelaide 500 would be revived if he was elected as state premier.

After winning the 2022 state election, Malinauskas announced the Adelaide Motorsport Festival would return on November 23-27, 2022. The event was rescheduled to March 24-26, 2023.

Format 

The Adelaide Motorsport Festival consists of a Super Sprint competition, demonstration track events and displays of collectable, historic and vintage cars and a street party. It also includes the Adelaide Rally, a four-day tarmac rally through the Adelaide Hills and surrounding areas with community event lunch stops.

Victoria Park Sprint 
On the Saturday and Sunday, the Victoria Park Sprint takes place at Victoria Park. Multiple categories of vehicles take part in the competition, ranging from former Formula One cars to historic touring cars, super sedans, time attack, open wheelers and others. Each category is on track for 10 minutes, with cars released at 30-second intervals in a super sprint format in which they race against the clock. Most notably, the 2018 event featured drag races between three different cars, each racing against a Red Bull Air Race aeroplane.

The Adelaide Rally 
The Adelaide Rally has the largest field size of any event of this type in the southern hemisphere. The event comprises competitive and touring tarmac rally elements. In 2017 the Rally Legends demonstration featured classic World Rally Car, Group B and Australian Rally icons, performing at speed on the Victoria Park Sprint circuit.

It includes several challenging rally stages in the Adelaide Hills and regions of South Australia.

Shannons Adelaide Rally is a predominantly nostalgic, classic themed motoring event that is supported by the South Australian Tourism Commission and the Adelaide Hills Council. The 2022 Shannons Adelaide Rally course covers more than 220 competitive kilometres across 40 closed road stages with lunch stops and dedicated spectator zones.

Displays 

Classic cars with rich motor racing heritage, as well as selected modern categories, have been displayed as part of the Adelaide Motorsport Festival. Approximately 12 grand prix cars were sourced to attend the event in 2015, including cars driven by Ayrton Senna, Gerhard Berger, Jack Brabham and Alan Jones.

Parades and street parties 
The Gouger Street Party has been a fixture on the Adelaide Rally calendar since 1997. At the end of the Friday running, the rally field, in addition to other vehicles and classic Formula One cars, headline the parade from Victoria Park to Gouger Street.

Converging on the city's restaurant precinct, attendees can check out the crews and cars with live music, pop-up bars and dining along the restaurant strip. Gouger Street is also adjacent to the Adelaide Market and Chinatown

East End Finale: After the Adelaide Rally, the entire field converges for the East End Finale and a free street party taking in Rundle Street East, East Terrace, Rundle Street and Rymill Park. This was actioned in 2019 and 2021 due to the Adelaide Motorsport Festival site within Victoria Park not being used. The finale sees the rally winners presented on the podium with over 500 vehicles on display and drivers and navigators in attendance.

Notable cars and drivers

Drivers 

Formula One drivers who have attended the Adelaide Motorsport Festival include:

 Stefan Johansson, who raced at the Australian Grand Prix in Adelaide between 1985 and 1989 and returned to drive the Ferrari 156/85 he raced in 1985. 
 Alister McRae, a former WRC rally driver, and brother of WRC world champion Colin McRae, driving an original 1993 Subaru Impreza at the event in 2018, a sister car to the one driven by his brother.
 Alan Jones, the 1980 Formula One world champion who drove in the Australian Grand Prix in 1985 and 1986, taking part in the 2019 Adelaide Rally in a McLaren 720S.
 David Brabham, Le Mans 24 Hour winner, three-time International Sports Car series champion, Australian Driver's Champion, British Formula 3 champion and two-time starter at the Australian Grand Prix, appearing in 2018, driving the Brabham BT62 in its high-speed public debut.
 Pierluigi Martini, who raced in Adelaide between 1985 and 1994, featuring in 2017 driving his Minardi M 189 Formula One car, which raced at the grand prix in Adelaide in 1989.
 Ivan Capelli, who raced in Adelaide between 1985 and 1990, attended the event in 2016 and 2018 driving a Leyton House CG891 March Formula One car, which he had driven at the 1989 Australian Grand Prix. The Italian Formula One podium finisher set a lap record with the CG891 on the Adelaide Motorsport Festival track in 2018.

A number of Australian touring car and V8 Supercars drivers have taken part in the Adelaide Motorsport Festival, including:

 Craig Lowndes, Jim Richards, John Bowe, Cam Waters and Tim Slade.

Notable cars 
Formula One cars and other open wheelers, Can Am and Le Mans cars, World Rally Championship cars and various types of Australian touring cars have appeared at the Adelaide Motorsport Festival.

 Leyton House Racing CG891 – Ivan Capelli raced this car in the Australian Grand Prix in Adelaide in 1989 and drove the car again at the Adelaide Motorsport Festival in 2016 and 2018.
 Dallara BMS19 – Andrea de Cesaris raced this car at the Australian Grand Prix in 1989, unfortunately spinning out of contention on the first lap. 
 Lola Larrousse LC87 - Phillipe Alliot and Yannick Dalmas managed several top 10 finishes with the Cosworth V8-powered cars. Dalmas claimed the season's highest finish for the team in Adelaide with fifth place.
 Lola Larrousse LC88 - Ex-Philippe Alliot car which raced in the 1988 Australian Grand Prix.
 Toleman TG185 - With United Colours of Benetton livery, this Toleman TG185 raced at the 1985 Australian Grand Prix. Driven by Teo Fabi, the Toleman only finished two races over the course of the 1985 season, with pole position in the German GP. 
 Arrows A21 - Mark Webber was a test driver for Arrows when this car was being developed in 2000. It was notable for being a full-carbon car, including the tub, wishbones, brakes and even the gearbox casing.
 T51 Cooper - The T51 made its F1 debut at Monaco in 1959 with Sir Jack Brabham taking the win. This is the car Sir Jack famously pushed over the line to finish fourth at Sebring after leading most of the race and giving him the points to win his first driver's championship.

Other noteworthy vehicles 
 555 Prodrive Subaru -The 1993 Subaru Impreza 555 is chassis #4 from that year's World Rally Championship campaign, and is the only one from that year still with its original shell. A sister car to the one driven by the legendary WRC champion Colin McRae, it was campaigned by Markku Alén and Ari Vatanen in 1993 before winning the 1994 Asia Pacific Rally Championship with New Zealander Possum Bourne at the wheel. This was also Subaru's very first Impreza 555 Group A manufacturers' and drivers' championship double.
 Brabham BT62 - Adelaide's own supercar, the Brabham BT62 first surfaced early in 2018, but it had not been seen at speed in public until the Adelaide Motorsport Festival later that year. With a 5.4-litre mid-mounted V8 making 700 hp and a kerb weight of just 972 kg, the car proved to be extremely quick.
 Lotus 12 - The first Lotus ever raced in Formula One and Graham Hill's first grand prix drive. Hill campaigned this Lotus 12 in Formula 2 in Europe in 1957, before it was entered in the Monaco GP in 1958. It also raced in the Dutch and Belgian GPs that year.
 Brabham BT17 CanAm - Built as a Group 7 Can Am sportscar, this BT17 was raced by Sir Jack Brabham himself in one race at Oulton Park.
 1987 JPS Norton RC588 Factory Works Race bike - This machine combines the very first race chassis and the first water-cooled factory works twin-rotor engine developed by Norton in the late 1980s. Its wins include the 1992 Isle of Man TT and the 1994 British Superbike Championship. Initially developed without the support of Norton management, the RC588 had a race-ready weight of 145 kg and power estimated at 135 hp.

Adelaide Motorsport Festival films 
Adelaide Motorsport Festival gained international attention in 2017 with its first film shot at night with the assistance of South Australia Police.

 Race to the City was filmed on the streets of Adelaide and featured three Formula One cars, a Holden Dealer Team Torana A9X, and a World Superbike-spec Ducati ridden by three-time world champion Troy Bayliss. Car drivers included multiple Bathurst winner John Bowe and Supercars drivers Cameron Waters and Tim Slade. Tour de France winner Stuart O'Grady had a cameo role. The film was produced with a budget under $25,000.
 Race to the City 2018 was produced with the bulk of footage shot in and around Adelaide with some scenes filmed at the Imola Circuit in Italy with Formula One drivers Pierluigi Martini and Ivan Capelli. Other drivers featured were WRC driver Alister McRae, multiple Bathurst winner Craig Lowndes, Le Mans winner and Formula One driver David Brabham and Supercars driver Tim Slade. Cars in this film were the Leyton House CG891 March driven by Capelli in 1989, the Brabham BT62, a LaFerrari hybrid hypercar and a Mitsubishi Evo rally car.

Recognition, attendance, impact 
The Adelaide Motorsport Festival saw an increase in attendance since its debut in 2014. In 2018, a total of 25,787 people attended the Victoria Park Sprint, 14,720 people at the Gouger Street Party and 6600 people seeing the Adelaide Rally along the route. The total number of spectators engaging with the Adelaide Motorsport Festival in 2018 was 47,107, up from 43,376 in 2017. The total economic benefit derived from the event for the state of South Australia was in excess of $8 million (Australian dollars).

References

External links 

 Adelaide Motorsport Festival
 Time Attack video

Adelaide 500
Motorsport
Supercars Championship circuits
Motorsport in Adelaide
Recurring sporting events established in 1990
Recurring sporting events disestablished in 2020
Motorsport in Australia
Rally Australia
Formula One
Formula One Grands Prix